The later-no-harm criterion is a voting system criterion formulated by Douglas Woodall. Woodall defined the criterion as "[a]dding a later preference to a ballot should not harm any candidate already listed." For example, a ranked voting method in which a voter adding a 3rd preference could reduce the likelihood of their 1st preference being selected, fails later-no-harm.

Voting systems that fail the later-no-harm criterion are vulnerable to the tactical voting strategies called bullet voting and burying, which can deny victory to a sincere Condorcet winner. However, the fact that all cardinal voting methods fail the later-no-harm criterion is essential to their favoring consensus options (broad, moderate support) over majoritarian options (narrow, strong support).

Complying methods 
The two-round system, single transferable vote, instant-runoff voting, contingent vote, Minimax Condorcet (a pairwise opposition variant which does not satisfy the Condorcet criterion), and Descending Solid Coalitions, a variant of Woodall's Descending Acquiescing Coalitions rule, satisfy the later-no-harm criterion.

When a voter is allowed to choose only one preferred candidate, as in plurality voting, later-no-harm can be either considered satisfied (as the voter's later preferences can not harm their chosen candidate) or not applicable.

Noncomplying methods 

Approval voting, Borda count, score voting, majority judgment, Bucklin voting, ranked pairs, the Schulze method, the Kemeny-Young method, Copeland's method, and Nanson's method do not satisfy later-no-harm. The Condorcet criterion is incompatible with later-no-harm (assuming the discrimination axiom, according to which any tie can be removed by some single voter changing her rating).

Plurality-at-large voting, which allows the voter to select up to a certain number of candidates, doesn't satisfy later-no-harm when used to fill two or more seats in a single district.

Checking Compliance 
Checking for satisfaction of the Later-no-harm criterion requires ascertaining the probability of a voter's preferred candidate being elected before and after adding a later preference to the ballot, to determine any decrease in probability. Later-no-harm presumes that later preferences are added to the ballot sequentially, so that candidates already listed are preferred to a candidate added later.

Examples

Anti-plurality 

Anti-plurality elects the candidate the fewest  voters rank last when submitting a complete ranking of the candidates.

Later-No-Harm can be considered not applicable to Anti-Plurality if the method is assumed to not accept truncated preference listings from the voter. On the other hand, Later-No-Harm can be applied to Anti-Plurality if the method is assumed to apportion the last place vote among unlisted candidates equally, as shown in the example below.

Approval voting 

Since Approval voting does not allow voters to differentiate their views about candidates for whom they choose to vote and the later-no-harm criterion explicitly requires the voter's ability to express later preferences on the ballot, the criterion using this definition is not applicable for Approval voting.

However, if the later-no-harm criterion is expanded to consider the preferences within the mind of the voter to determine whether a preference is "later" instead of actually expressing it as a later preference as demanded in the definition, Approval would not satisfy the criterion.  Under Approval voting, this may in some cases encourage the tactical voting strategy called bullet voting.

Borda count

Coombs' method 

Coombs' method repeatedly eliminates the candidate listed last on most ballots, until a winner is reached. If at any time a candidate wins an absolute majority of first place votes among candidates not eliminated, that candidate is elected.

Later-No-Harm can be considered not applicable to Coombs if the method is assumed to not accept truncated preference listings from the voter. On the other hand, Later-No-Harm can be applied to Coombs if the method is assumed to apportion the last place vote among unlisted candidates equally, as shown in the example below.

Copeland

Dodgson's method 

Dodgson's' method elects a Condorcet winner if there is one, and otherwise elects the candidate who can become the Condorcet winner after the fewest  ordinal preference swaps on voters' ballots.

Later-No-Harm can be considered not applicable to Dodgson if the method is assumed to not accept truncated preference listings from the voter. On the other hand, Later-No-Harm can be applied to Dodgson if the method is assumed to apportion possible rankings among unlisted candidates equally, as shown in the example below.

Kemeny–Young method

Majority judgment

Minimax

Ranked pairs

Score voting

Schulze method

Criticism 

Woodall, author of the Later-no-harm writes:

See also

Later-no-help criterion
Monotonicity criterion

References 

 D R Woodall, "Properties of Preferential Election Rules", Voting matters, Issue 3, December 1994 
 Tony Anderson Solgard and Paul Landskroener, Bench and Bar of Minnesota, Vol 59, No 9, October 2002. 
 Brown v. Smallwood, 1915

Electoral system criteria